FC Spaeri (Georgian: საფეხბურთო კლუბი სპაერი) is a Georgian association football club, based in Tbilisi. Since the 2022 season the club competes in Liga 2, the second tier of Georgian football system.

History
Spaeri was established in 2017 by five individuals working in the Special State Protection Service. The team mostly consisted of the servicemen of this organization and initially participated in the Tbilisi Open League - the lowest, 5th level of the league pyramid before becoming a member of Regionuli Liga.

Spaeri finished the 2018 season as runners-up and obtained the right to take part in the newly created Liga 4. Having won 21 games out of 27, they claimed the first place there with automatic promotion to Liga 3.

The debut in the third division was impressive with Spaeri vying for a promotion play-off place up until the last matchday. Eventually, the club came two points short of the third place.

The team improved their performance in 2021 and following an unbeaten run in twenty league games won Liga 3 six rounds before the end of the season.

Initially, they did not seem encouraging in the second division. With a single point in initial four matches, Spaeri were sitting bottom of the table. However, the team quickly recovered, produced the longest unbeaten streak of the season and qualified for promotion play-offs. Forward Levan Papava became the top scorer of the league with 17 goals netted during the regular season. He added a brace in a dramatic tie against Gagra,  scored another in the penalty shootout, but the team failed to secure one more promotion.

Kakha Maisuradze has been coaching the team since 2017.

Seasons

Current squad
As of 1 March 2023

Stadium
Spaeri stadium, located in an eastern suburb of Tbilisi, was officially opened in September 2018. Тhe pitch has an artificial turf.

Honours
 
● Regionuli Liga, Runners-up: 2018 (East A)

● Liga 4, Winners: 2019

● Liga 3,  Winners: 2021

● Liga 2, Runners-up: 2022

References

External links
 Profile on Soccerway
 Page on Facebook

Football clubs in Georgia (country)
Association football clubs established in 2017